Hans Busk the younger DL (11 May 1815 in London – 11 March 1882 in Westminster) was one of the originators of the "Volunteers".

He was educated at King's College London and Trinity College, Cambridge, graduating with a BA in 1839 and an M.A. in 1844. He was called to the bar at the Middle Temple in 1841.

While still an undergraduate, he lobbied the Government to form rifle clubs for defence against invasion, and created a model rifle club at Cambridge in 1837. This grew into the "Volunteers" movement, which he helped to pioneer. He served with the 1st Middlesex Rifle Volunteers and with the Royal Victoria Rifle Club, and wrote a number of practical manuals regarding rifle training.  He was styled "Captain Busk".

He also took an interest in designing yachts and lifeboats, and advocated the installation of lifeboat stations. He was a gastronome, and founded the School of Cookery at South Kensington.

In 1873 he became a Fellow of the Royal Geographical Society.

Family

He was the son of Hans Busk the elder.  His siblings included Julia Clara Pitt Byrne and Rachel Harriette Busk; another sister, Maria Georgiana, married Sir Robert Loder, 1st Baronet.

Another sister, Frances Rosalie, married Rev. Charles Vansittart in May 1845, but the marriage was deeply troubled, and Hans Busk was involved in legal proceedings between his sister and her husband, including the precedent-setting case Vansittart v. Vansittart before the Court of Chancery.

Hans Busk "Barrister-at-Law" died 11th March 1882 at 21 Ashley Place, Westminster. In his will proved 12th May 1882, he left a personal estate of £22,576 divided in the main, between his nephew Wilfrid Hans Loder and his widowed daughter Annie Mary Moore also of 21 Ashley Place.

Because he had the same name as his father, some well-known reference sources confuse the two. For instance Alumni Cantabrigienses incorrectly states that he is the father, rather than the brother of Rachel Harriette Busk; and the Dictionary of National Biography incorrectly states that he was high sheriff of Radnorshire (a post occupied by his father).

Works 
1858: The Rifleman's Manual; or, Rifles, and how to use them; 2nd ed. London: Charles Noble
1858: The Rifle, and how to use it; 3rd ed. London: Routledge 
1859: The Rifle, and how to use it; 4th ed. London: Routledge 
(1859) 1971: --do.-- reissue of 4th ed. Richmond, Surrey: Richmond Pub Co.
1859: The Navies of the World; their present state, and future capabilities. London: Routledge, Warnes & Routledge
(1859) 1971:--do.-- reissued: Richmond, Surrey: Richmond Pub Co.
1860: Rifle Volunteers: how to organize and drill them; 7th ed. London: Routledge  
1860: Hand-Book for Hythe [i.e. for the School of Musketry at Hythe]. London: Routledge, Warnes & Routledge
(1860) 1971: --do.--reissued: Richmond, Surrey: Richmond Pub Co.

References

 Hans Busk (1815–1882) (thePeerage.com)

1815 births
1882 deaths
Alumni of King's College London
Alumni of Trinity College, Cambridge
19th-century Welsh writers
Deputy Lieutenants of Middlesex
Fellows of the Royal Geographical Society
Artists' Rifles soldiers
Volunteer Force officers